St. Peter's Church (Danish: Sankt Peders Kirke) is located at Næstved on the Danish island of Zealand. St. Peter's is situated in the Næstved parish of the Diocese of Roskilde of the Church of Denmark. The church is one of Denmark's foremost Gothic buildings.

History
The church was first documented in a monasterial letter from 1135.

Today's Gothic church replaced an older Romanesque cross-shaped building built of limestone and brick from the second half of the 12th century. This in turn was built on the site of an even older stone church with two western towers. In 1375, the extension to the present Gothic church began. Built of red brick, it is one of Denmark's largest and finest Gothic buildings, scarcely altered since 1375. The chancel, with its five tall windows, is particularly impressive. The church has undergone several restorations, including one from 1852 to 1856 by the architects Niels Sigfred Nebelong and Georg Kretz, and again from 1883 to 1885 by the architects Johan Daniel Herholdt and Vilhelm Ahlmann. It is Næstved's largest church, measuring 55 m in length.

Furnishings
The church's most notable fresco is on the north wall of the chancel. It depicts King Valdemar IV and Queen Helvig. There are several uncovered frescoes in the church by lime painter Morten Maler whose frescoes also appear at  Gerlev Church (Gerlev kirke) and  Gimlinge Church (Gimlinge Kirke) in Slagelse. 

The most imposing feature of the church is the pulpit, designed by Lorentz Jørgensen of Holbæk in 1671. Two rows of choir stalls and a bronze font date back to about 1500. 
 
The altarpiece is headed by a late-Gothic arched crucifix  which the church received in 1844 from nearby Fodby Church (Fodby kirke). The tower clock dates to 1736 and is the work of J.D. Galle of Næstved. The church also contains a number of gravestones and epitaphs dedicated to the families of Næstved.

The church organ is from 1960 and  built by Marcussen & Son.

Burials
Notable burials in the church:
 Axel Arenfeldt  (15901647), government official and landowner
 Otte Brahe (15791651), landowner
 Caspar Paslick (15301597), diplomat
 Abel Schrøder (c. 1602–1676)m woodcarver and organist
 Peter West (17081878), military officer and landowner

See also
 Old Town Hall (Næstved)
 Architecture of Denmark

References

External links
Sct. Peders Kirke website

Churches in Næstved Municipality
12th-century churches in Denmark
Churches in the Diocese of Roskilde
Brick Gothic
Gothic architecture in Denmark
Lutheran churches converted from Roman Catholicism
Næstved